The Dhaka Union of Journalists is a trade union of journalists based in Dhaka, Bangladesh. Shaban Mahmud is the union's president and Sohel Haider Chowdhury is its general secretary. The union monitors freedom of speech and violence against journalists in Bangladesh.

History
The Dhaka Union of Journalists was founded in 1947. It called for wages to be increased for journalists in the ninth wage board. In 2017, the union protested against section 57 of the Information and Communication Technology Act.

References

1947 establishments in India
Journalists' trade unions
Organisations based in Dhaka
Trade unions in Bangladesh
Bangladeshi journalism organisations